Three Swords for Rome is a 1964 Italian  peplum film co-written and directed  by Roberto Mauri and starring Roger Browne. The film was produced by Aldo Piga, who also composed the film's score.

Plot

Cast
 Roger Browne as Fabio
 Mimmo Palmara as Maximo
 Mario Novelli as Julio (credited as Tony Freeman)
 Lisa Gastoni as Elena
 Mario Feliciani 
 Philippe Hersent 		
 Walter Brandi
 Nerio Bernardi 
 Véra Valmont
 Alberto Cevenini as Elagabalus
 Silvia Maresca as Julia Soaemias

Release
Three Swords for Rome was released in Italy on December 31, 1964. On its release in the United States, it ran at 85 minutes.

References

Sources

External links

Peplum films
1960s adventure films
Films directed by Roberto Mauri
Sword and sandal films
Films with screenplays by Edoardo Mulargia
1960s Italian films